Coleophora timarella is a moth of the family Coleophoridae. It is found in Arizona, United States.

References

timarella
Moths of North America
Moths described in 1993